Esther Ada Hart (née Bloomfield; 13 May 1863 – 7 September 1928) was a survivor of the sinking of the . She, her husband Benjamin, and their daughter, Eva, decided to immigrate to Canada due to the higher standard of living. The Harts boarded the Titanic on 10 April 1912 on its maiden voyage to New York City. They were second-class passengers.

Early life
Emily Esther Louisa Bloomfield was born on 13 May 1863, in Stockwell, Surrey, England to George Bloomfield and Esther Bloomfield (née Hayes).

Esther married George Hossack Arthur Brooke (b. 1853) on 28 November 1881 in Lambeth, London, England; Esther had 9 children during her first marriage whom all died young, George Brooke died in early 1890.

Esther married Benjamin Hart (b. 1864) in the autumn of 1900, they had one daughter, Eva, on 31 January 1905.

Titanic 
Esther expressed anxiety towards the ship, claiming that the arrogance surrounding it was "flying in the face of God" and that "something dreadful" would happen which would result in it not arriving at New York. As a result of this premonition, she did not sleep at night. Instead, she stayed up every night fully dressed in anticipation of the "dreadful something" to happen. She slept during the day. Because of this, she was awake when the ship struck the iceberg on the night of 14 April and felt a "slight bump". Certain that this was the reason she was uneasy, she asked Benjamin to investigate. According to their daughter Eva, Benjamin returned and without a word escorted them from their cabin. The Harts went up on deck and Esther and Eva boarded Lifeboat 14, while Benjamin went down with the ship when it sank. Esther and Eva were separated from each other when their boat's occupants were dispersed among several other boats.

They stayed briefly in New York before returning to the United Kingdom, all hopes of a new life in Canada having died with Benjamin.

Later Life 
Esther and Eva lived in Chadwell Heath, near London, with Esther's parents. 
Esther Hart  died on 7 September 1928, in Romford, London, England at age 65. Both she and Eva always maintained that the Titanic broke in half before sinking, a question that would not be solved until the wreck was found in 1985.

On 26 April 2014, a letter written by Esther on that fateful day was sold at an auction for the price of £119,000. It only survived because it had been placed in the husband's jacket, which was given to her to keep her warm. It is reported to be the last written communication from the RMS Titanic.

References

External links
 

Articles with hCards
RMS Titanic survivors
1863 births
1928 deaths